Andorra competed at the 2015 European Games, in Baku, Azerbaijan from 12 to 28 June 2015.

Team

Athletics

Andorra finished in eleventh place with 163 points.

Men's

Women's

Basketball

Cycling

Judo

Swimming

References

Nations at the 2015 European Games
European Games
2015